Hysteria is a term used colloquially to mean ungovernable emotional excess and can refer to a temporary state of mind or emotion. In the nineteenth century, female hysteria was a commonly diagnosed physical illness in both men and women. It is assumed that the basis for diagnosis operated under the belief that women are predisposed to mental and behavioral conditions; an interpretation of sex-related differences in stress responses. In the twentieth century, it shifted to being considered a mental illness. Many influential people such as Sigmund Freud and Jean-Martin Charcot dedicated research to hysteria patients.

Currently, most doctors practicing medicine do not accept hysteria as a medical diagnosis. The blanket diagnosis of hysteria has been fragmented into myriad medical categories such as epilepsy, histrionic personality disorder, conversion disorders, dissociative disorders, or other medical conditions. Furthermore, lifestyle choices, such as choosing not to wed, are no longer considered symptoms of psychological disorders such as hysteria.

History
The word hysteria originates from the Greek word for uterus, hystera. The oldest record of hysteria dates back to 1900 BCE when Egyptians recorded behavioral abnormalities in adult women on the Kahun Papyrus. The Egyptians attributed the behavioral disturbances to a wandering uterusthus later dubbing the condition hysteria. To treat hysteria Egyptian doctors prescribed various medications. For example, doctors put strong smelling substances on the patients' vulvas to encourage the uterus to return to its proper position. Another tactic was to smell or swallow unsavory herbs to encourage the uterus to flee back to the lower part of the female's abdomen.

The ancient Greeks accepted the ancient Egyptians' explanation for hysteria; however, they included in their definition of hysteria the inability to bear children or the unwillingness to marry. Plato and Aristotle believed that hysteria, which Plato also called female madness, was directly related to these women’s lack of sexual activity and described the uterus as those who suffered from it as having a sad, bad, or melancholic uterus. In the 5th century BCE Hippocrates first used the term hysteria. Ancient Romans also attributed hysteria to an abnormality in the womb; however, discarded the traditional explanation of a wandering uterus. Instead, the ancient Romans credited hysteria to a disease of the womb or a disruption in reproduction (i.e., a miscarriage, menopause, etc.). Hysteria theories from the ancient Egyptians, ancient Greeks, and ancient Romans were the basis of the Western understanding of hysteria.

Between the fifth and thirteenth centuries, however, the increasing influence of Christianity in the Latin West altered medical and public understanding of hysteria. St. Augustine's writings suggested that human suffering resulted from sin, thus hysteria became perceived as satanic possession. With the shift in perception of hysteria came a shift in treatment options. Instead of admitting patients to a hospital, the church began treating patients through prayers, amulets, and exorcisms. At this time, writings such as Constantine the African’s Viaticum and Pantegni, described women with hysteria as the cause of amor heroycus, a form of sexual desire so strong that it caused madness, rather than someone with a problem who should be cured.

Trota de Ruggiero is considered the first female doctor in Christian Europe as well as the first gynecologist, though she could not become a magister. She recognized that women were often ashamed to go to a doctor with gynecological issues, and studied women’s diseases and attempted to avoid common misconceptions and prejudice of the era. She prescribed remedies such as mint for women suffering from hysteria. Hildegard of Bingen was another female doctor, whose work was part of an attempt to combine science and faith. She agreed with the theories of Hippocrates and suggested hysteria may be connected to the idea of original sin; She believed that men and women were both responsible for original sin, and could both suffer from hysteria. Furthermore, during the Renaissance period many patients of hysteria were prosecuted as witches and underwent interrogations, torture, exorcisms, and execution. During this time the common point of view was that women were inferior beings, connected to Aristotle’s ideas of male superiority. Saint Thomas Aquinas supported this idea and in his writing, Summa Theologica stated “'some old women' are evil-minded; they gaze on children in a poisonous and evil way, and demons, with whom the witches enter into agreements, interacting through their eyes”. This time of fear of witches and sorcery is part of the rules of celibacy and chastity imposed on the clergy. Philippe Pinel believed that there was little difference between madness and healthy people, and believed that people should be treated if they were unwell. He considered hysteria a female disorder.

However, during the sixteenth and seventeenth centuries activists and scholars worked to change the perception of hysteria back to a medical condition. Particularly, French physician Charles Le Pois insisted that hysteria was a malady of the brain. In addition, in 1697, English physician Thomas Sydenham theorized that hysteria was an emotional condition, instead of a physical condition. Many physicians followed Lepois and Sydenham's lead and hysteria became disassociated with the soul and the womb. During this time period, science started to focalize hysteria in the central nervous system. As doctors developed a greater understanding of the human nervous system, the neurological model of hysteria was created, which further propelled the conception of hysteria as a mental disorder. Joseph Raulin published a work in 1748, associating hysteria with the air quality in cities, he suggested that men and women could both have hysteria, women would be more likely to have it due to laziness.

In 1859 Paul Briquet defined hysteria as a chronic syndrome manifesting in many unexplained symptoms throughout the body's organ systems. What Briquet described became known as Briquet's syndrome, or Somatization disorders, in 1971. Over a ten-year period, Briquet conducted 430 case studies of patients with hysteria. Following Briquet, Jean-Martin Charcot studied women in an asylum in France and used hypnosis as treatment. Charcot detailed the intricacies of hysteria, understanding it as being caused by patriarchy. He also mentored Pierre Janet, another French psychologist, who studied five of hysteria's symptoms (anesthesia, amnesia, abulia, motor control diseases, and character change) in depth and proposed that hysteria symptoms occurred due to a lapse in consciousness. Both Charcot and Janet inspired Freud's work. Freud theorized hysteria stemmed from childhood sexual abuse or repression. Briquet, Freud and Charcot noted male hysteria; both genders could exhibit the syndrome. Hysterics may be able to manipulate their caretakers, complicating treatment.

During the twentieth century, as psychiatry advanced in the West, anxiety and depression diagnoses began to replace hysteria diagnoses in Western countries. For example, from 1949 to 1978, annual admissions of hysteria patients in England and Wales decreased by roughly two-thirds. With the decrease of hysteria patients in Western cultures came an increase in anxiety and depression patients. Theories for why hysteria diagnoses began to decline vary, but many historians infer that World WarII, along with the use of the diagnosis of shell-shock, westernization, and migration shifted Western mental health expectations. Twentieth-century western societies expected depression and anxiety manifest itself more in post World War II generations and displaced individuals; and thus, individuals reported or were diagnosed accordingly. In addition, medical advancements explained ailments that were previously attributed to hysteria such as epilepsy or infertility. World Wars caused military doctors to become focused on hysteria as during this time there seemed to be a rise in cases, especially under instances of high stress, in 1919 Arthur Frederick Hurst wrote that “many cases of gross hysterical symptoms occurred in soldiers who had no family or personal history of neuroses, and who were perfectly fit”. In 1970 Colin P. McEvedy and Alanson W. Beard suggested that Royal Free Disease (Royal Free Hospital outbreak, now also known as chronic fatigue), which mainly affected young women, was an epidemic of hysteria. They also said that hysteria had a historically negative connotation, however that should not prevent doctors from assessing symptoms of the patient. In 1980, after a gradual decline in diagnoses and reports, hysteria was removed from the American Psychiatric Association's Diagnostic and Statistical Manual of Mental Disorders (DSM), which had included hysteria as a mental disorder from its second publication in 1968.

The term is still used in the twenty-first century, though not as a diagnosis. When used, it is often a general term for any dramatic displays of outrage or emotion.  .

Historical symptoms
Historically, the symptoms of hysteria have a large range.
Shortness of breath
Anxiety
Insomnia
Fainting
Amnesia
Paralysis
Pain
Spasms
Convulsive fits
Vomiting
Deafness
Bizarre movements
Seizures
Hallucinations
Inability to speak
Infertility

Historical treatment
Regular marital sex
Pregnancy
Childbirth
"Paroxysmal convulsions" (orgasms)
Rest cure

Notable figures

Charcot
In the late nineteenth century, French neurologist Jean-Martin Charcot tackled what he referred to as "the great neurosis" or hysteria. Charcot theorized that hysteria was a hereditary, physiological disorder. He believed hysteria impaired areas of the brain which provoked the physical symptoms displayed in each patient. While Charcot believed hysteria was hereditary, he also thought that environmental factors such as stress could trigger hysteria in an individual.

Charcot published more than 120 case studies of patients who he diagnosed with hysteria, including Marie "Blanche" Whittman. Whittman was referred to as the "Queen of Hysterics," and remains the most famous patient of hysteria. To treat his patients, Charcot used hypnosis, which he determined was successful only when used on hysterics. Using patients as props, Charcot executed dramatic public demonstrations of hysterical patients and his cures for hysteria, which many suggest produced the hysterical phenomenon. Furthermore, Charcot noted similarities between demon possession and hysteria, and thus, he concluded "demonomania" was a form of hysteria.

Freud
In 1896 Sigmund Freud, an Austrian neurologist, published "The Aetiology of Hysteria". The paper explains how Freud believes his female patients' neurosis, which he labels hysteria, resulted from sexual abuse as children. Freud named the concept of physical symptoms resulting from childhood trauma: hysterical conversion. Freud hypothesized that in order to cure hysteria the patient must relive the experiences through imagination in the most vivid form while under light hypnosis. However, Freud later changed his theory. His new theory claimed that his patients imagined the instances of sexual abuse, which were instead repressed childhood fantasies. By 1905, Freud retracted the theory of hysteria resulting from repressed childhood fantasies. Freud was also one of the first noted psychiatrists to attribute hysteria to men. He diagnosed himself with hysteria, writing that he feared his work had exacerbated his condition.

Modern perceptions
For the most part, hysteria does not exist as a medical diagnosis in Western culture and has been replaced by other diagnoses such as conversion or functional disorders. The effects of hysteria as a diagnosable illness in the eighteenth and nineteenth centuries has had a lasting effect on the medical treatment of women's health. The term hysterical, applied to an individual, can mean that they are emotional, irrationally upset, or frenzied. When applied to a situation not involving panic, hysteria means that that situation is uncontrollably amusingthe connotation being that it invokes hysterical laughter.

Race in Hysteria 

According to Laura Briggs’s The Race of Hysteria: “Overcivilization” and the “Savage” Woman in Late Nineteenth-Century Obstetrics and Gynecology, women could be categorized into three steps of civilization: the savage, the civilized, and the overcivilized. Referencing Edward Tylor’s conception that humans evolve through three stages: savage, barbarian, and civilized. Briggs believes that Hysteria was thought to be caused by overcivilization. Terms such as “savage” were reserved for people in extreme poverty or of minority descent (Africans, Asians, Indigenous, Jewish, etc). Because of this distinction between the civilized and the savage during the 19th Century, Hysteria was diagnosed as a disease among mostly middle and upper-class white women.

Many middle and upper-class white men, identified middle and upper-class white women as endangering the race with their low fertility, while non-white women, immigrants, and poor people had many children. During the 19th Century, white women were categorized as “weak, frail and nervous” which reflected the diagnosed symptoms for hysteria such as nervousness, fainting, and ill reproductive bodies. On the contrary, minority, and impoverished women were seen as “strong, hardy, and prolifically fertile.” This caused worry among white men who feared that middle and upper-class white women were causing the depopulation of their race. This growing conception would later be coined, “race suicide” by Edward A. Ross.

As race suicide became a more recognizable fear in Europe and the U.S., many people attempted to solve it by targeting white women's nutrition, overeducation, sexual limbo, and physical health. Additionally, press and Nativist parties ushered a national concern by connecting the reproduction of white women to the reproduction of first and second-generation immigrant women.  “[Race suicide] pitted white women against the more-fecund women of supposedly ‘‘inferior’’ races supports interpretations of race suicide in terms of anti-immigrant sentiment.” As the white public became more unsettled by increased immigration and the declining birthrates of white children, white women were blamed if they lacked the “American ideal” of 4-6 children. Additionally, Immigrants from all minorities were the target of xenophobic remarks and eventually forced sterilization in the U.S. due to eugenics legislation.

See also

References

Further reading

 Karen Starr and Lew Aron, “Women on the Couch: Genital Stimulation and the Birth of Psycho-analysis,” Psychoanalytic Dialogues 21, no. 4 (2011): 375

External links

Is Hysteria Real? Brain Images Say Yes at the New York Times.
The H-Word, Guardian Unlimited, 2002-09-02
Hysteria, BBC Radio 4 discussion with Juliet Mitchell, Rachel Bowlby & Brett Kahr (In Our Time, April 22, 2004)
New York Times VIDEO: Opinion | Hysterical Girl

Symptoms and signs of mental disorders
Fear
History of psychology
Obsolete terms for mental disorders
Pejorative terms for people with disabilities
Emotions
Uterus